"Share My Love" is the lead single by American singer, songwriter and producer R. Kelly from his eleventh studio album Write Me Back. The song was written and produced by Kelly himself. It peaked at number one on the Billboard Adult R&B Songs chart, number 13 on the Billboard Hot R&B/Hip-Hop Songs chart, and number 21 on the Billboard Bubbling Under Hot 100 Singles chart. It also reached number 34 in Japan.

Charts

Weekly charts

Year-end charts

References

2012 singles
R. Kelly songs
Songs written by R. Kelly
Song recordings produced by R. Kelly
2011 songs
RCA Records singles